Conducted by Dr. Kent Hatteberg, the Collegiate Chorale is the premiere choral ensemble at the University of Louisville. The Chorale performs primarily unaccompanied repertoire and is known to commission works by Lithuanian composers Vytautas Miškinis and Vaclovas Augustinas. The Chorale enjoyed rising popularity in the late 1990s and now performs regularly at national choral events around the United States with a large following.

Events
 8th National Collegiate Choral Organization (NCCO) National Conference, College Park, Maryland 2019
 ACDA National Conference, Chicago, Illinois 2011
Small Ensemble Rehearsal Techniques session with Simon Carrington
Reading Session Choir
 Kentucky Music Educators Association State Conference – Louisville, Kentucky 2011
 ACDA National Conference, Oklahoma City, Oklahoma 2009
 2nd NCCO National Conference 2008, Cincinnati, Ohio
 ACDA Southern Division Conference, Headliner Concert 2008 with Cardinal Singers
 American Choral Directors Association National Convention – Los Angeles, California 2005
 American Orff-Schulwek National Convention – Louisville, Kentucky 2003
 National MENC Convention – Nashville, Tennessee 2002
 Kentucky Music Educators Association State Conference – Louisville, Kentucky 2002
 Inauguration of George W. Bush – Washington, D.C. 2001
 "Together We Sing" celebration, American Choral Directors Association National Convention – San Antonio, Texas 2001
 American Choral Directors Association Southern Division Conference – Orlando, Florida 2000
 Kentucky Music Educators Association State Conference – Louisville, Kentucky 1998

Major works
The Collegiate Chorale has become well known in the region for performing various major works with the Louisville Orchestra, Orchestra Kentucky and Louisville's Choral Arts Society, including the world premiere of Felix Mendelssohn's Gloria in November 1997. 
 Beethoven's Symphony No. 9 - May 2019
 Mozart's Requiem - October, 2018
 Michael Gordon's Natural History - April 2018
 Holst's The Planets - February 2018 (Women of the University of Louisville Collegiate Chorale)
 Mahler's Symphony No. 2 - October 2016
 Bernstein's Mass - September 2015
 Orff's Carmina Burana – October 2014
 Beethoven's Symphony No. 9 – April 2014
 Britten's War Requiem – April 2013
 Orff's Carmina Burana – February 2013
 Mozart's Coronation Mass – January 2013
 Verdi's Requiem – January 2010
 Dominick Argento's Cenotaph (World Premiere) 2009
 Ralph Vaughan Williams's Dona Nobis Pacem 2009
 Rihards Dubra's Te Deum 2008
 Berlioz's Romeo and Juliet 2008
 Saint-Saëns' Samson and Dalila 2008
 Wolfgang Amadeus Mozart's Die Zauberflöte - September 2007
 Ralph Vaughan Williams' Toward the Unknown Region - March 2007
 John Adams' Harmonium - March 2007
 Howard Shore's Lord of the Rings Symphony - January 2007
 Mozart's Requiem - January 2007
 Mendelssohn's A Midsummer Night's Dream - October 2006
 Gounod's Mors et Vita - September 2006
 Poulenc's Gloria – March 2006
 Beethoven's Symphony No. 9 – March 2006
 Schubert's Mass in C – January 2006
 Mozart's Vesperae Solennes de Confessore – October 2005
 Verdi's Quattro pezzi sacri – October 2005
 Orff's Carmina Burana – February 2005
 Mozart's Coronation Mass – January 2005
 Verdi's Requiem – March 2004
 Vaughan Williams' Sea Symphony – February 2004
 Brahms's Schicksalslied – February 2004
 Britten's War Requiem – March 2003
 Beethoven's Symphony No. 9 – May 2002
 Kodály's Budavari Te Deum – March 2002
 Poulenc's Stabat Mater - March 2002

See also
 The University of Louisville Cardinal Singers
 American Choral Directors Association

External links
 University of Louisville School of Music
 Kentucky Music Educators Association
 American Choral Directors Association

Choirs in Louisville, Kentucky
University choirs
Collegiate Chorale